Uncial 0181 (in the Gregory-Aland numbering), is a Greek uncial manuscript of the New Testament, dated paleographically to the 4th-century (or the 5th).

Description 
The codex contains a small parts of the Gospel of Luke 9:59-10:14, on one parchment leaf (15 cm by 14 cm). The text is written in one column per page, 26 lines per page, in uncial letters. 

The Greek text of this codex is a representative of the Alexandrian text-type. Aland placed it in Category II.

Currently it is dated by the INTF to the 4th or 5th century.

The codex is housed at the Papyrus Collection of the Austrian National Library (Pap. G. 39778) in Vienna.

See also 

 List of New Testament uncials
 Textual criticism

References

Further reading 

 Walter Till, Papyrussammlung der Nationalbibliothek in Wien: Katalog der Koptischen Bibelstücke. Die Pergamente, ZNW 39 (1940).
 S. Porter, New Testament Greek Papyri and Parchments Vienna 2008, pp. 123–129.

External links 

  – digitalized manuscript
 Uncial 0181 at the Wieland Willker, "Textual Commentary"

Greek New Testament uncials
5th-century biblical manuscripts
Biblical manuscripts of the Austrian National Library